Gustavo E. Romero is a professor of Relativistic Astrophysics at the University of La Plata and Superior Researcher of the National Research Council of Argentina. Currently, he is Director of the Argentine Institute of Radio Astronomy (IAR). He is past President of the Argentine Astronomical Society and currently he is the leader of GARRA research group and a Helmholtz International Fellow. Romero has been honored with several award for his achievements in scientific research, including the award of the Argentine Academy of Sciences and the Houssay Prize

Research work
Romero has worked extensively on gamma-ray, neutrino and cosmic-ray astrophysics, black holes, and scientific philosophy. He is well known for his investigations of blazars, microquasars, and unidentified gamma-ray sources. His research has received around 11000 citations in the academic literature, making him one of the most cited scientists of Argentina.

In the field of philosophy, he has contributed with research on Supertask, spacetime ontology, and aesthetics. Romero is usually considered a disciple of the Argentine-Canadian philosopher and physicist Mario Bunge
.

Selected publications
Hadronic gamma-ray emission from windy microquasars
Unidentified 3eg gamma-ray sources at low galactic latitude
Optical microvariability of southern AGNs
Accretion vs. colliding wind models for the gamma-ray binary LS I+ 61 303: an assessment
Gamma-ray emission from Wolf-Rayet binaries
Reissner-Nordström black hole lensing
Supernova remnants and γ-ray sources
Linearized stability of charged thin-shell wormholes
Hadronic high-energy gamma-ray emission from the microquasar LS I+ 61 303

Books

Introduction to Black Hole Astrophysics
Scientific Philosophy 
La Naturaleza del Tiempo
Contemporary Materialism: Its Ontology and Epistemology (Editor with Camprubi & Pérez-Jara)

References

External links 
 
 

Living people
Academic staff of the National University of La Plata
1964 births